Montana I-190, the Montana Marijuana Legalization and Tax Initiative was a cannabis legalization initiative that appeared on the November 3, 2020 Montana general election ballot. Passing with 56% approval, the initiative legalized recreational marijuana in the state effective January 1, 2021. Along with Arizona, New Jersey and South Dakota, Montana was one of four states that legalized cannabis via ballot measures in the November 2020 election.

The sponsor of the initiative was New Approach Montana, in partnership with the Marijuana Policy Project.

History
Initiative I-190 (legislation) and matching constitutional amendment initiative were submitted by New Approach Montana to the Montana Secretary of State in January, and approved for signature gathering as of May 1, 2020. Following a lawsuit and a declaration from the Montana Supreme Court, the Montana Secretary of State determined that mail-in voter signatures would be allowed for all initiatives without requiring notary seal, and starting May 9, the sponsors made a downloadable mail-in form available. On June 19, groups collecting voter signatures for the legalization initiative said they had submitted almost twice the minimum to the Secretary of State by the deadline. The sponsors announced in July that they had reached the threshold for ballot inclusion, based on county-level voter certification.

On August 13, the Montana Secretary of State announced it had qualified for the November ballot.

The initiative was approved by voters on November 3, 2020.

Polling
On Initiative 190

On whether recreational marijuana should be legal

Results

Notes

See also
Cannabis in Montana
2020 Arizona Proposition 207
2020 New Jersey Public Question 1
2020 South Dakota Constitutional Amendment A

References

External links
2020 ballot issues at Montana Secretary of State
Montana I-190, Marijuana Legalization and Tax Initiative (2020) at Ballotpedia

2020 cannabis law reform
Cannabis law in the United States
Proposed laws of the United States
I-190
Initiative 190
Montana Initiative 190
Montana ballot measures